The 2018 Sandown 500 (known for sponsorship purposes as the 2018 Rabble.club Sandown 500) was a motor racing event for Supercars, held on the weekend of 14 to 16 September 2018. The event was held at Sandown Raceway in Melbourne, Victoria, Australia and consisted of one race, 500 kilometres in length. It was the twelfth event of sixteen in the 2018 Supercars Championship and hosted Race 24 of the series. It was also the first event of the 2018 Enduro Cup.

The race was won by Jamie Whincup and Paul Dumbrell driving a Holden Commodore ZB.

Background 

The event was the 48th running of the Sandown 500, which was first held in 1964 as a six-hour race for series production touring cars. It was the fourteenth time the race had been held as part of the Supercars Championship and the sixth time it formed part of the Enduro Cup. The defending winners of the race were Cameron Waters and Richie Stanaway.

The event was promoted as a "retro round", with teams encouraged to use adaptations of Australian touring car liveries from the 1960s, 1970s and 1980s, although some teams extended beyond these parameters when devising a livery.

The following cars carried a retro livery during the event:

Results

Practice

Qualifying 

Notes
– Andre Heimgartner received a 3-place grid penalty for impeding Scott Pye during Qualifying.

Qualifying Race 1

Qualifying Race 2

Race

Championship standings after Race 24 

Drivers' Championship standings

Teams Championship

Enduro Cup

 Note: Only the top five positions are included for three sets of standings.

References 

Rabble.club Sandown 500
Wilson Security Sandown 500
Pre-Bathurst 500